The Kearney Micropolitan Statistical Area, as defined by the United States Census Bureau, is an area consisting of two counties in Nebraska, anchored by the city of Kearney.

As of the 2010 census, the area had a population of 52,591 (though a July 1, 2011 estimate placed the population at 53,278).

Counties
Buffalo
Kearney

Communities
Places with 25,000 or more inhabitants
Kearney (Principal City)
Places with 1,000 to 5,000 inhabitants
Gibbon
Holdrege
Minden
Ravenna
Shelton
Places with 500 to 1,000 inhabitants
Bertrand
Elm Creek
Places with less than 500 inhabitants
Amherst
Atlanta
Axtell
Funk
Heartwell
Loomis
Miller
Norman
Pleasanton
Riverdale
Wilcox
Unincorporated places
Buda
Keene
Lowell
Newark

Townships

Anderson
Armada
Beaver
Blaine 
Cedar
Center (Buffalo County)
Center (Phelps County)
Cherry Creek
Collins
Cosmo
Cottonwood
Divide (Buffalo County)
Divide (Phelps County)
Eaton 
Elm Creek
Gardner
Garfield (Buffalo County)
Garfield (Phelps County)
Gibbon
Grant (Buffalo County)
Grant  (Kearney County)
Harrison
Hayes
Industry-Rock Falls
Laird
Lake
Liberty 

Lincoln 
Logan (Buffalo County)
Logan  (Kearney County)
Loup
Lowell 
May 
Mirage 
Newark 
Odessa
Oneida 
Platte
Prairie
Riverdale
Rusco
Sartoria
Schneider
Scott
Sharon
Shelton
Sheridan
Sherman
Thornton
Union
Valley
Westmark
Westside
Williamsburg

Demographics
As of the census of 2000, there were 49,141 people, 18,573 households, and 12,129 families residing within the μSA. The racial makeup of the μSA was 95.55% White, 0.49% African American, 0.31% Native American, 0.62% Asian, 0.03% Pacific Islander, 2.03% from other races, and 0.98% from two or more races. Hispanic or Latino of any race were 4.34% of the population.

The median income for a household in the μSA was $38,015, and the median income for a family was $45,562. Males had a median income of $30,085 versus $21,029 for females. The per capita income for the μSA was $17,814.

Future development
Today, some area officials are proposing to upgrade to a metropolitan area with the addition of Phelps County in the future.

See also
Nebraska census statistical areas

References

 
Buffalo County, Nebraska
Kearney County, Nebraska